Crewood Hall is a country house to the northeast of the village of Kingsley, Cheshire, England.  It dates from the 16th century, and has a porch dated 1638.  Initially timber-framed, the building was encased in brick and remodelled in the 19th century.  It has stone dressings and tiled roofs, and is in two storeys.  The house consists of a hall with two cross wings and a two-storey porch at the end of the left wing. The lower storey of the porch is in sandstone and in the upper storey the timber-framing is exposed.  The house is recorded in the National Heritage List for England as a designated Grade II* listed building.  Associated with the house, and also listed at Grade II, are two farm buildings; stables, and a shippon and barn.

See also

Listed buildings in Kingsley, Cheshire

References

Houses completed in the 16th century
Houses completed in 1638
Country houses in Cheshire
Timber framed buildings in Cheshire
Grade II* listed buildings in Cheshire
Grade II* listed houses
1638 establishments in England